Alve Valdemi del Mare (Cremona, 1885 — Barcelona, 1972) was an Italian painter established in Barcelona. Formed in Bergamo and in Milan.  Later left to Paris, where he was called to fight in World War I. At a later date, in 1926 came back to Barcelona, where collaborated with Sala Gaspar and La Pinacoteca. To artistic level, specialised in the dead natures  and the paintings of flowers, although also preserve landscapes and his figures.

References 

Painters from Cremona
Painters from Barcelona
1885 births
1972 deaths